Star Wars: Lords of the Sith is a Star Wars novel by Paul S. Kemp, published in April 2015. Set between the film Revenge of the Sith and the novel Star Wars: Tarkin, it features Darth Vader and Emperor Palpatine facing off against revolutionaries. Lords of the Sith was one of the first four novels published in the franchise after Lucasfilm redefined Star Wars continuity in April 2014.

Overview
In Lords of the Sith, Vader and Palpatine find themselves hunted by revolutionaries on the Twi'lek planet Ryloth.

Publication
With the 2012 acquisition of Lucasfilm by The Walt Disney Company, most of the licensed Star Wars novels and comics produced since the originating 1977 film Star Wars were rebranded as Star Wars Legends and declared non-canon to the franchise in April 2014. Lords of the Sith was subsequently announced as one of the first four canon novels to be released in 2014 and 2015.

Impact
Lords of the Sith introduces Moff Delian Mors, a lesbian whom New York Daily News noted is the first openly gay character in the new Star Wars canon.

References

External links
 

2015 American novels
2015 science fiction novels
Books based on Star Wars
Del Rey books
LGBT speculative fiction novels